Robert Lorimer was a Presbyterian minister who served in Haddington. After nearly 50 years in the Church of Scotland ministry he walked out during the schism known as The Disruption and joined the Free Church of Scotland.

Life
Robert Lorimer was born on 11 May 1765, the son of Robert Lorimer, Kirkconnell. He was educated at University of Glasgow. After graduation he became tutor in the family of Grant of Rothiemurchus. He was licensed by the Church of Scotland Presbytery of Abernethy in September 1791. He was subsequently ordained by the Presbytery of Penpont, on 3 July 1793. He served as chaplain to the Southern Regiment of Fencibles. He was award a doctorate LL.D. from the University of Glasgow in 1795. He was presented to Haddington by James, Earl of Hopetoun, and admitted on 16 June 1796. At the Disruption he joined the Free Church and worked as a colleague minister of St John's Free Church, Haddington, from 1843. After 50 years in the ministry he was invited to a public dinner which was presided over by Angus Makellar. He died on 9 November 1848.

Family
He married 6 July 1801, Elizabeth (died 19 September 1843), daughter of John Gordon of Balmoor, W.S., and had issue— 
Robert, surgeon, Haddington, born 21 May 1802, died 9 November 1848
John Gordon, minister of St David's Parish, and afterwards of St David's Free Church, Glasgow
Margaret Stewart, born 27 June 1803, died 19 April 1827
Jane, born 4 May 1806, died 31 March 1823
Alexander Patrick, born 3 October 1807
James, born 16 April 1810, died 11 September 1829.

Publications
Lorimer, with John Cook, wrote the New Statistical Account for the parish of Haddington. Lorimer was an Evangelical and Cook was a Moderate.
Two single Sermons (Edinburgh, 1813–29)
Character of the Rev. Thomas Davidson of Muirhouse, D.D. (Muirhead's Sermons)
Sermon: The Reign of Christ, the Joy of the World
Sermon: The Psalmist's intense love for the ordinances of public worship
Sermon: Reasons for Rejoicing in the Lord's Day
Sermon: The Observance of the Christian Sabbath

Photographic representation
Lorimer was photographed by Hill & Adamson for the Disruption painting. Lorimer was born a few years after Conrad Heyer but nevertheless was one of the earliest-born people ever photographed. In the final painting Lorimer is depicted immediately to the viewer's right of David Brewster (who is reading a book with his hand on his glasses) and not far to the viewer's left of Thomas Chalmers in the very centre above Patrick MacFarlan who is signing the deed of demission. Lorimer, above a pile of books, is two to the viewer's left of David Welsh who is holding a copy of the protest.

References

Citations

Sources

 

19th-century Ministers of the Free Church of Scotland
18th-century Ministers of the Church of Scotland
19th-century Ministers of the Church of Scotland
1848 deaths
1765 births